{{DISPLAYTITLE:21-hydroxysteroid dehydrogenase (NADP+)}}

In enzymology, a 21-hydroxysteroid dehydrogenase (NADP+) is an enzyme that catalyzes the chemical reaction

pregnan-21-ol + NADP+  pregnan-21-al + NADPH + H+

Thus, the two substrates of this enzyme are pregnan-21-ol and NADP+, whereas its 3 products are pregnan-21-al, NADPH, and H+.

This enzyme belongs to the family of oxidoreductases, specifically those acting on the CH-OH group of donor with NAD+ or NADP+ as acceptor. The systematic name of this enzyme class is 21-hydroxysteroid:NADP+ 21-oxidoreductase. Other names in common use include 21-hydroxy steroid dehydrogenase, 21-hydroxy steroid (nicotinamide adenine dinucleotide phosphate), dehydrogenase, 21-hydroxy steroid dehydrogenase (nicotinamide adenine dinucleotide, phosphate), NADP+-21-hydroxysteroid dehydrogenase, and 21-hydroxysteroid dehydrogenase (NADP+).

References

 

EC 1.1.1
NADPH-dependent enzymes
Enzymes of unknown structure